St. Mary is a church  in Corneilla-de-Conflent, southern France. Built in the 11th-12th centuries, in Romanesque style, it was originally an Augustinian monastery. It was declared a national monument in 1840.

History
Mentioned for the first time in 1018, the church, owned by the bishops of Elne, was acquired by count Wilfred II of Cerdanya, who made their capital in the town, in 1025. In 1094 count William I ordered the construction of a monastery here, which was founded in 1097 and entrusted to the Augustinians. 

Until 1167, the priory acquired numerous privileges and possessions, including castles and villages. In 1356 King Peter III of Aragon ceded to the monks the old palace of the counts.

In the 14th century the church was fortified with a line of walls featuring pyramidal merlons. The priory continued to increase in importance until its secularization in 1592. After the French Revolution in 1789 it was repeatedly modified.

Architecture
The church, in Romanesque style, has a façade in pink marble, surmounted by a tympanum decorated by a Madonna enthroned with Child and Angels. The columns supporting the archivolts  have capitals with rampaging lions, palms and sheep. 

The circular apse features exteriorly Lombard bands and a sawtooth-shaped frieze, as well as three windows with archivolts over small columns.

The interior is on a nave and two aisles. It houses a retablo by Jaume Cascalls (1345). The bell tower is in Lombard Romanesque style; it has Lombard bands decorating each of the three storey, the middle one having two windows and the upper one a large arch.

Photographs

Sources

Buildings and structures completed in the 12th century
1097 establishments in Europe
1090s establishments in France
Mary, Corneilla-de-Conflent
Monuments historiques of Pyrénées-Orientales